Josiah ( or ) or Yoshiyahu was the 16th king of Judah (–609 BCE) who, according to the Hebrew Bible, instituted major religious reforms by removing official worship of gods other than Yahweh. Josiah is credited by most biblical scholars with having established or compiled important Hebrew scriptures during the "Deuteronomic reform" which probably occurred during his rule. Josiah became king of the Kingdom of Judah at the age of eight, after the assassination of his father, King Amon. Josiah reigned for 31 years, from 641/640 to 610/609 BCE.

Josiah is known only from biblical texts; no reference to him exists in other surviving texts of the period from Egypt or Babylon, and no clear archaeological evidence, such as inscriptions bearing his name, has ever been found. Nevertheless, most scholars believe that he existed historically and that the absence of documents is due to few documents of any sort surviving from this period, and to Jerusalem having been occupied, conquered, and rebuilt over thousands of years.

Biblical narrative 
The Bible describes him as a righteous king, a king who "walked in all the way of David his father, and turned not aside to the right hand or to the left". He is also one of the kings mentioned in the genealogy of Jesus in Matthew's gospel, one of the two divergent genealogies of Jesus in the New Testament (cf. Matthew 1:10–11).

Family 
According to the biblical narrative, Josiah was the son of King Amon and Jedidah, the daughter of Adaiah of Bozkath. His grandfather Manasseh was one of the kings blamed for turning away from the worship of Yahweh. Manasseh adapted the Temple for idolatrous worship. Josiah's great-grandfather was King Hezekiah, a noted reformer also respected by the biblical writers as having "done what was right in the sight of the LORD, as David had done.

Josiah had four sons: Johanan, and Eliakim (born c. 634 BCE), whose mother was Zebidah the daughter of Pedaiah of Rumah; and Mattanyahu (c. 618 BCE) and Shallum (633/632 BCE), whose mother was Hamutal, the daughter of Jeremiah of Libnah. Eliakim had his name changed by Pharaoh Necho of Egypt to Jehoiakim.

His youngest son Shallum succeeded Josiah as king of Judah, under the name Jehoahaz. Shallum was succeeded by Eliakim, under the name Jehoiakim, who was succeeded by his own son Jeconiah; then, Jeconiah was succeeded to the throne by his uncle Mattanyahu, under the name Zedekiah. Zedekiah was the last king of Judah before the kingdom was conquered by Babylon and the people exiled.

Religious reform 
The Second Book of Chronicles records that Josiah was eight years old when he became king. In the eighth year of his reign, he "began to seek the God of his father David" and in the twelfth year of that reign he began a program of destruction of Baalist altars and images throughout Jerusalem and Judah. The Chronicler records in detail the execution of this program, whereas the account in 2 Kings begins with the restoration of the temple in Jerusalem, which both accounts say was initiated in the eighteenth year of his reign.

Josiah ordered the High Priest Hilkiah to use the tax money which had been collected over the years to renovate the temple. While Hilkiah was clearing the treasure room of the Temple he discovered a scroll described in 2 Kings as "the book of the Law", and in 2 Chronicles as "the book of the Law of the LORD given by Moses". The book is not identified in the text as the Torah and many scholars believe this was either a copy of the Book of Deuteronomy or a text that became a part of Deuteronomy.

Hilkiah brought this scroll to Josiah's attention. Josiah consulted the prophetess Huldah, who assured him that the evil foretold in the document for non-observance of its instructions, would come, but not in his day; "because", she said, "thine heart was tender and thou didst humble thyself before the Lord". An assembly of the elders of Judah and Jerusalem and of all the people was called, and Josiah then encouraged the exclusive worship of Yahweh, forbidding all other forms of worship. The instruments and emblems of the worship of Baal and "the host of heaven" were removed from the Jerusalem Temple. Local sanctuaries, or High Places, were destroyed, from Beer-sheba in the south to Beth-el and the cities of Samaria in the north. Josiah had pagan priests executed and even had the bones of the dead priests of Bethel exhumed from their graves and burned on their altars. Josiah also reinstituted the Passover celebrations.

According to  an unnamed "man of God" (sometimes identified as Iddo) had prophesied to King Jeroboam of the northern Kingdom of Israel (Samaria), approximately three hundred years earlier, that "a son named Josiah will be born to the house of David" and that he would destroy the altar at Bethel. And the only exception to this destruction was for the grave of an unnamed prophet he found in Bethel, who had foretold that these religious sites Jeroboam erected would one day be destroyed (see ). Josiah ordered the double grave of the "man of God" and of the Bethel prophet to be left alone as these prophecies had come true.

Josiah's reforms are described in two biblical accounts, 2 Kings 22–23, and 2 Chronicles 34–35. They began with the ending of ancient Israelite religious practices, and the astral cults that had become popular in the 8th century, and led to centralisation of worship in Jerusalem, and the destruction of the temple at Bethel.

According to the later account in 2 Chronicles, Josiah destroyed altars and images of pagan deities in cities of the tribes of Manasseh, Ephraim, "and Simeon, as far as Naphtali", which were outside of his kingdom, Judah, and returned the Ark of the Covenant to the Temple.

Book of the Law 

The Hebrew Bible states that the priest Hilkiah found a "Book of the Law" in the temple during the early stages of Josiah's temple renovation. Hilkiah then gave the scroll to his secretary Shaphan, who took it to King Josiah. According to the Bible, King Josiah then changed his form of leadership entirely, entering into a new form of covenant with the Lord. He wiped out all of the pagan cults that had formed within his land. He, along with his people, then entered into this new covenant with the Lord to keep the commandments of the Lord.

For much of the nineteenth and twentieth centuries, it was agreed among biblical scholars that this "Book of the Law" was an early version of the Book of Deuteronomy, but recent biblical scholarship sees it as a largely legendary narrative about one of the earliest stages of the creation of Deuteronomistic work. That is, historical-critical biblical scholars generally believe that the "Book of the Law"—an early predecessor of the Torah—was invented by Josiah's priests, who were driven by ideological interests to centralize power under Josiah in the Temple in Jerusalem. William G. Dever, for example, argues that the Book of the Law was actually composed by orthodox Yahwist priests, who attributed it to the legendary figure of Moses and then hid it in the Temple, where it would be dramatically discovered; in this way, a "miraculous new Word from Yahweh" would seem to have appeared, giving Judah a chance to redeem itself and save itself from the advance of the Neo-Babylonian Empire.

Many scholars see the whole core narrative, from Joshua to 2 Kings, as comprising a Deuteronomistic History (DtrH) written during Josiah's reign. In fact, some recent European theologians even go so far as to posit that most of the Torah and Deuteronomistic History was composed and finalized several centuries later, during the Persian period. However, most biblical scholars are coming to believe that the Deuteronomistic History was composed using other earlier sources, including a brief chronicle of king's names, age at the beginning of their reign, and their mother's names.

Prophets and King Josiah 
According to rabbinic interpretation, Huldah said to the messengers of King Josiah, "Tell the man that sent you to me ...", indicating by her unceremonious language that for her Josiah was like any other man. The king addressed her, and not Jeremiah, because he thought that women are more easily stirred to pity than men, and that therefore the prophetess would be more likely than Jeremiah to intercede with God in his behalf. Huldah was a relative of Jeremiah, both being descendants of Rahab by her marriage with Joshua. While Jeremiah admonished and preached repentance to the men, she did the same to the women. Huldah was not only a prophetess, but taught publicly in the school, according to some teaching especially the oral doctrine. It is doubtful whether "the Gate of Huldah" in the Second Temple (Middot 1:3) has any connection with the prophetess Huldah; it may have meant "Cat's Gate"; some scholars, however, associate the gate with Huldah's schoolhouse (Rashi to Kings l.c.).E. C. L. G.

The prophetic activity of Jeremiah began in the reign of Josiah; he was a contemporary of his relative the prophetess Hulda and of his teacher Zephaniah. These three prophets divided their activity: Hulda spoke to the women and Jeremiah to the men in the street, while Zephaniah preached in the synagogue. When Josiah restored the true worship, Jeremiah went to the exiled ten tribes, whom he brought to Israel under the rule of the pious king. Although Josiah went to war with Egypt against the prophet's advice, Jeremiah knew that this was an error by the otherwise pious king; and later he bitterly laments the king's death: the fourth chapter of Lamentations beginning with a dirge on Josiah.

King Josiah, who foresaw the impending national catastrophe, concealed the Ark and its contents (including Aaron's rod, the vial of manna and the anointing oil) within a hidden chamber which had been built by King Solomon] (Tosefta, Sotah, 13a); cf. Babylonian Talmud (Kereithot 5b) and their whereabouts will remain unknown until, in the Messianic age, the prophet Elijah shall reveal them (Mekhilta l.c.).

Foreign relations 

When Josiah became king of Judah in about 641/640 BCE, the international situation was in flux. The Assyrian Empire was beginning to disintegrate, the Neo-Babylonian Empire had not yet risen to replace it, and Egypt to the west was still recovering from Assyrian rule. In this power vacuum, Jerusalem was able to govern itself for the time being without foreign intervention.

In the spring of 609 BCE, Pharaoh Necho II led a sizable army up to the Euphrates River to aid the Neo-Assyrian Empire, which was collapsing under the attacks of the Medes and the Neo-Babylonian Empire. Taking the coast route Via Maris into Syria at the head of a large army, consisting mainly of mercenaries; and supported by his Mediterranean fleet along the shore, Necho passed the low tracts of Philistia and Sharon. However, the passage over the ridge of hills which shuts in on the south of the great Jezreel Valley was blocked by the Judean army led by Josiah. The reason for Josiah attempting to halt the Egyptian campaign is not known, but he may have considered that the Assyrians and Egyptians were weakened by the death of pharaoh Psamtik I only a year earlier (610 BCE): Psamtik having been appointed and confirmed by Assyrian kings Esarhaddon and Ashurbanipal. According to the Biblical Books of Chronicles, Necho had not intended to do battle with the Judeans and was confused by Josiah's decision to attack him, supposedly sending a letter saying "what have we done to each other, king of Judah? I am not coming against you this day."

Josiah attempted to block the advance at Megiddo, where a fierce battle was fought and Josiah was killed. Necho then joined forces with the Assyrian Ashur-uballit II and crossed the Euphrates to lay siege to Harran. The combined forces failed to capture the city, and Necho retreated to northern Syria.

Death 

There are two accounts of Josiah's death in the Bible. The Second Book of Kings merely states that Necho II met Josiah at Megiddo and killed him, whereas the second book of Chronicles gives a lengthier account and states that Josiah was fatally wounded by Egyptian archers and was brought back to Jerusalem to die. His death in the latter account was attributed to him "not listening to what Necho had said at God's command..." when Necho stated: "What have I to do with you, king of Judah? I am not coming against you today, but against the house with which I am at war; and God has commanded me to hurry. Cease opposing God, who is with me, so that he will not destroy you."

The account in Chronicles is considered unreliable by some scholars, as it is based on the description of the death of a different king, Ahab, in 1 Kings, and it meets the Chronicler's religious agenda to attribute the death of a righteous king to some form of sin.

Some researchers have concluded from the account in Kings that Josiah did not meet Necho in battle but was summoned by Necho as a vassal, investigated, and beheaded for failing to pay the correct tribute or tax to Egypt.

Rabbinic Literature remarks on Josiah's piety and his father Amon: "The fact that Amon was the most sinful of all the wicked kings of Judah (II Chron. xxxiii. 23) is brought out in the Talmud (Sanh. 103b) as follows:(Sanh. 104a) Ahaz suspended the sacrificial worship, Manasseh tore down the altar, Amon made it a place of desolation [covered it with cobwebs]; Ahaz sealed up the scrolls of the Law (Isa. viii. 16), Manasseh cut out the sacred name, Amon burnt the scrolls altogether [compare Seder Olam, R. xxiv. This is derived from the story of the finding of the Book of the Law, II Kings, xxii. 8]; Ahab permitted incest, Manasseh committed it himself, Amon acted as Nero was said to have done toward his mother Agrippina. And yet, out of respect for his son Josiah, Amon's name was not placed on the list of the kings excluded from the world to come." also that Josiah's death was brought about because despite his sincere religious reform, he had in fact been deceived; thus he refused to heed the Prophet Jeremiah, thinking that no sword would pass through the Land of Israel. He was struck by 300 darts; he made no complaint except to acknowledge "The Lord is righteous, for I rebelled against His commandment.

Succession 
After the setback in Harran, the Pharaoh Necho left a sizeable force behind, and returned to Egypt. On his return march, Necho found that Jehoahaz had succeeded his father Josiah. Necho deposed Jehoahaz, who had been king for only three months, and replaced him with his older brother, Jehoiakim. Necho imposed on Judah a levy of a hundred talents of silver (about 3 tons or about 3.4 metric tons) and a talent of gold (about 75 pounds or about 34 kilograms). Necho then took Jehoahaz back to Egypt as his prisoner. The defeat of Josiah at Megiddo essentially represents the end of the rule of the Davidic line, since not only were Josiah's successors short-lived, but also Judah's relative independence had crumbled in the face of a resurgent Egypt bent on regaining its traditional control of the region, and the imminent rise of the Babylonian empire which also sought control.

Necho had left Egypt in 609 BCE to relieve the Assyrian Harran under Babylonian siege. Josiah's actions may have provided aid to the Babylonians by engaging the Egyptian army.

Sources 
No archaeological evidence for Josiah as a person exists. The inscription of the ring says, "(belonging) to Nathan-Melech, Servant of the King". Although it may not directly mention King Josiah by name, it does appear to be from the same time period in which he would have lived. Seals and seal impressions from the period show a transition from those of an earlier period which bear images of stars and the moon, to seals that carry only names, a possible indication of Josiah's enforcement of monotheism. No other archaeological evidence of Josiah's religious reforms has been discovered.

The date of Josiah's death can be established fairly accurately. The Babylonian Chronicles date the battle at Harran between the Assyrians and their Egyptian allies against the Babylonians from Tammuz (July–August) to Elul (August–September) 609 BCE. On that basis, Josiah was killed in the month of Tammuz (July–August) 609 BCE, when the Egyptians were on their way to Harran.

See also 
 List of artifacts in biblical archaeology

Notes

References

Further reading 
 The Bible Unearthed: Archaeology's New Vision of Ancient Israel and the Origin of Its Sacred Texts for the possible role of Josiah in creation of the Bible.
 Hertz, J. H. (1936). The Pentateuch and Haftoras. Deuteronomy. Oxford University Press, London.
 Friedman, R. (1987). Who Wrote the Bible? New York: Summit Books.

External links 

 Jewish Encyclopedia: Josiah
 Catholic Encyclopedia: Josias
 Genealogy of the House of David- Josiah, King of Judah

640s BC births
609 BC deaths
7th-century BC Kings of Judah
Ancient child monarchs
Deaths by arrow wounds
Military personnel killed in action
Monarchs killed in action